Bertram Benjamin Loel (5 November 1878 – 19 July 1957), known as Bertie Loel, was an Australian rules footballer who played with  Fitzroy in the Victorian Football League (VFL).

He was the younger brother of Herb Loel who played for Carlton in the VFA and West Perth in the WAFA.

He later served in the Boer War, World War I and World War II.

References

External links

1878 births
1957 deaths
Australian rules footballers from Victoria (Australia)
Fitzroy Football Club players